Aetbaar or Aitbaar may refer to:

Hindi films:
 Aetbaar, 2004, starring Amitabh Bachchan
 Aitbaar, 1985, starring Raj Babbar